Palaeanodonta ("ancient toothless animals") is an extinct clade of stem-pangolins. They were insectivorous, possibly fossorial, and lived from the Early Paleocene to Early Oligocene in North America, Europe and East Asia. While the taxonomic grouping of Palaeanodonta has been debated, it is widely thought that they are a sister group to pangolins.

Anatomy

Skull 
Palaeanodonts generally have low and caudally-broad skulls, with notable lambdoid crests and inflated bullae and squamosals.

Teeth 
Despite the name of the group and contrary to their pangolin relatives, palaeanodonts are known to have had teeth. Early palaeanodonts retained minimal tribosphenic post-canines while later species had peglike or otherwise reduced molar crowns. Many also had large, characteristic cuspids.

Classification and phylogeny

Traditional classification 
 Order: †Palaeanodonta (Matthew, 1918) (stem-pangolins)
 Family: †Epoicotheriidae (Simpson, 1927)
 Family: †Escavadodontidae (Rose & Lucas, 2000)
 Family: †Metacheiromyidae (Wortman, 1903)
 Incertae sedis:
 Genus: †Amelotabes (Rose, 1978)
 Genus: †Arcticanodon (Rose, 2004)
 Genus: †Melaniella (Fox, 1984)

Revised classification 
 Order: †Palaeanodonta (Matthew, 1918) (stem-pangolins)
 Family: †Epoicotheriidae (Simpson, 1927)
 Genus: †Alocodontulum (Rose, 1978)
 †Alocodontulum atopum (Rose, 1977)
 Genus: †Auroratherium (Tong & Wang, 1997)
 †Auroratherium sinense (Tong & Wang, 1997)
 Genus: †Dipassalus (Rose, 1991)
 †Dipassalus oryctes (Rose, 1991)
 Genus: †Pentapassalus (Gazin, 1952)
 †Pentapassalus pearcei (Gazin, 1952)
 †Pentapassalus woodi (Guthrie, 1967)
 Genus: †Tubulodon (Jepsen, 1932)
 †Tubulodon taylori (Jepsen, 1932)
 Subfamily: †Epoicotheriinae (Simpson, 1927)
 Genus: †Epoicotherium (Simpson, 1927)
 †Epoicotherium unicum (Douglass, 1905)
 Genus: †Molaetherium (Storch & Rummel, 1999)
 †Molaetherium heissigi (Storch & Rummel, 1999)
 Genus: †Tetrapassalus (Simpson, 1959)
 †Tetrapassalus mckennai (Simpson, 1959)
 †Tetrapassalus proius (West, 1973)
 Genus: †Xenocranium (Colbert, 1942)
 †Xenocranium pileorivale (Colbert, 1942)
 Family: †Ernanodontidae (Ting, 1979)
 Genus: †Asiabradypus (Nessov, 1987)
 †Asiabradypus incompositus (Nessov, 1987)
 Genus: †Ernanodon (Ting, 1979)
 †Ernanodon antelios (Ting, 1979)
 Family: †Escavadodontidae (Rose & Lucas, 2000)
 Genus: †Escavadodon (Rose & Lucas, 2000)
 †Escavadodon zygus (Rose & Lucas, 2000)
 Family: †Metacheiromyidae (paraphyletic family) (Wortman, 1903)
 Genus: †Brachianodon (Gunnell & Gingerich, 1993)
 †Brachianodon westorum (Gunnell & Gingerich, 1993)
 Genus: †Mylanodon (Secord, 2002)
 †Metacheiromys dasypus (Secord, 2002)
 Subfamily: †Metacheiromyinae (paraphyletic subfamily) (Wortman, 1903)
 Genus: †Metacheiromys (Wortman, 1903)
 †Metacheiromys dasypus (Osborn, 1904)
 †Metacheiromys marshi (Wortman, 1903)
 Genus: †Palaeanodon (Matthew, 1918)
 †Palaeanodon ignavus (Matthew, 1918)
 †Palaeanodon nievelti (Gingerich, 1989)
 †Palaeanodon parvulus (Matthew, 1918)
 Subfamily: †Propalaeanodontinae (Schoch, 1984)
 Genus: †Propalaeanodon (Rose, 1979)
 †Palaeanodon parvulus (Rose, 1979)
 Incertae sedis:
 Genus: †Amelotabes (Rose, 1978)
 †Amelotabes simpsoni (Rose, 1978)
 Genus: †Arcticanodon (Rose, 2004)
 †Arcticanodon dawsonae (Rose, 2004)
 Genus: †Melaniella (Fox, 1984)
 †Melaniella timosa (Fox, 1984)

Phylogenetic tree 
The phylogenetic relationships of Palaeanodonta are shown in the following cladogram:

References 

 
Fossil taxa described in 1918